The 2019 Nelson mayoral election was part of the New Zealand local elections that were held on 12 October 2019 to elect the Mayor of Nelson, New Zealand.

Key dates
Key dates for the election were:

1 July: Electoral Commission enrolment campaign starts.
19 July: Nominations open for candidates. Rolls open for inspection.
16 August: Nominations close at 12 noon. Rolls close.
21 August: Election date and candidates' names announced.
20 to 25 September: Voting documents delivered to households. Electors can post the documents back to electoral officers as soon as they have voted.
12 October: Polling day. Voting documents must be at council before voting closes at 12 noon. Preliminary results will be available as soon as all ordinary votes are counted.
17 to 23 October: Official results, including all valid ordinary and special votes, declared.

Candidates

Declared candidates
Mel Courtney, Nelson City Councillor and former Nelson MP
Bill Dahlberg, Nelson City Councillor
Rachel Reese, incumbent Mayor of Nelson
Tim Skinner, Nelson City Councillor
Mike Ward, former Nelson City Councillor and List MP, candidate for mayor in 1986, 1989, 2007, and 2010
John Wakelin
Avner Nahmias

Results

References

2019 elections in New Zealand
Mayoral elections in New Zealand
Politics of Nelson, New Zealand